HNLMS Harlingen may refer to the following ships of the Royal Netherlands Navy that have been named after Harlingen:

 HNLMS Harlingen (1983), an Alkmaar-class minehunter
 , a Vlissingen-class mine countermeasures vessel

Royal Netherlands Navy ship names